Cheryl Heller is an American business strategist and designer. She is the Founder of the first MFA program in Design for Social Innovation at the School of Visual Arts, President of the design lab "CommonWise", and winner of the AIGA Medal for her contribution to the field of design. She is a Rockefeller Bellagio Fellow  Heller has been credited as founding the first design department in a major advertising agency and her work focuses on investigating the contributions design have on human health and its impact on society.

Education 
When Heller was younger she attended the School of the Museum of Fine Arts where she studied painting and printmaking. She then decided to go back to school to earn a bachelor's degree in Fine Arts at Ohio Wesleyan University. After earning her bachelor's degree she went on to study at Goddard College, where she received her Masters of Fine Arts in Creative Writing.

Careers 
Heller began her career in advertising in 1972 at Giardini/Russell, in Boston. She co-founded Heller/Breene inside of the WCRS Group. Heller/Breene was a small innovative firm specializing in design, where she was chairperson and creative director until 1989; two months after her departure WCRS Group sold the firm Cipriani.  She left Heller/Breene two work at Wells Rich Greene BDDP; after 3 1/2 years she became the executive vice president and executive creative director at Frankfurt Gips Balkind.  In 2003, she began to partner with entrepreneurs and organizations to further social and environmental projects.

After becoming president of the advertising company she grew the division to US$50m in billings when it took off and became an independent entity. She began to help grow business from small enterprises into multi-billion dollar global market leaders. Heller has worked as a small businesses consultant, working with businesses, as well as writing about design strategies for businesses. She has taught creativity to leaders and organizations around the world, and written about branding.

In 1999, she created the "Ideas that Matter" program for Sappi, that awards grants to designers working on social and environmental projects. Heller is the former Board Chair and current Adviser to PopTech, a Senior Fellow at the Babson Social Innovation Lab  on the Innovation Advisory Board for the Lumina Foundation, and serves as an adviser to DataKind. She is one of the advisors at the Bill and Melinda Gates Foundation and USAID on an initiative in attempt to integrate Human Centered Design into public health. She has led an initiative to diminish the flow of young people from foster care to homelessness.  Heller served as an adviser to  Paul Polak and the Cooper Hewitt National Design Museum on the exhibit, "Design for the Other 90%." She is a  Matrix Award  winner for excellence in communication and has been profiled through articles in the New York Times, the Boston Globe, BusinessWeek, and many others.

MFA Program 
Heller was the founding chairperson of the MFA program for Design for Social Innovation in 2011 for the School of Visual Arts. This degree program is recognized as being the first of its kind. It allows students to further develop skills in several fine art skills after they have received their bachelor's degree. It is a three-year program where graduates are working as creative leaders in government, industry, healthcare, technology and global NGOs. It is a two to a student to enter into a three-year program that will provide them with a higher skill level in creative writing, visual arts, photography and much more. This will make the individual more desire in the world field.

Heller began to teach and undergraduate class called “Design for Good”  where she is helping kids develop into leaders. Working in the design industry takes a lot of leadership skills and a lot of hard work. The social design industry is changing dramatically and Heller is encouraging students to further their education and receive credentials. With credentials, it allows students more options and allows them to develop a higher skill level in the field. While in the program Heller teaches her students to become aware of major issues going on in the present day. They will also begin to gain skills in entrepreneurship, leadership, metrics and data visualization, mapping, ethics, service design, and informal economies and cultures. The main idea behind social innovation is to find solutions for society, humanity.

Clients 
Heller has a large clientele. Her clients range from major car companies like Ford Motor Company to magazines and international hotels. She has worked with some clothing companies including the Gap and American Express. She took part in giving donation to small business in order to help them grow and succeed. She encouraged designer to work not only for self interest but for public interest. Lastly, she also worked with sunglass companies and oil companies

References

External links
 A Busy Woman, an essay by Cheryl Heller for the Design Observer
 Good Capital Project Design Team Announced

Year of birth missing (living people)
Living people
American designers
Ohio Wesleyan University alumni
AIGA medalists
Women in advertising
American advertising executives